Jermaine Post (born 10 June 1992) is a Dutch professional racing cyclist.

See also
 2014 Parkhotel Valkenburg Continental Team season

References

External links
 

1992 births
Living people
Dutch female cyclists
People from Oegstgeest
Cyclists from South Holland
21st-century Dutch women